Calceolaria helianthemoides is a species of plant in the Calceolariaceae family. It is endemic to Ecuador.

References

helianthemoides
Endemic flora of Ecuador
Near threatened plants
Taxonomy articles created by Polbot